The Communist Party of Bangladesh (Marxist) is a Communist political party in Bangladesh. The Communist Party of Bangladesh (Marxist) Party have major presence in Barisal and Dhaka.

Doctor M.A. Samad is the general secretary of Communist Party of Bangladesh (Marxist).

References 

2007 establishments in Bangladesh
Communist parties in Bangladesh
Political parties established in 2007